T-box transcription factor T, also known as Brachyury protein, is encoded for in humans by the TBXT gene. Brachyury functions as a transcription factor within the T-box family of genes.  Brachyury homologs have been found in all bilaterian animals that have been screened, as well as the freshwater cnidarian Hydra.

History 
The brachyury mutation was first described in mice by Nadezhda Alexandrovna Dobrovolskaya-Zavadskaya in 1927 as a mutation that affected tail length and sacral vertebrae in heterozygous animals. In  homozygous animals the brachyury mutation is lethal at around embryonic day 10 due to defects in mesoderm formation, notochord differentiation and the absence of structures posterior to the forelimb bud (Dobrovolskaïa-Zavadskaïa, 1927). The name brachyury comes from the Greek brakhus meaning short and oura meaning tail.

In 2018 HGNC updated the human gene name from T to TBXT, presumably to overcome difficulties associated with searching for a single letter gene symbol. The mouse gene has been changed to Tbxt.

Tbxt was cloned by Bernhard Herrmann and colleagues and proved to encode a 436 amino acid embryonic nuclear transcription factor. Tbxt binds to a specific DNA element, a near palindromic sequence TCACACCT through a region in its N-terminus, called the T-box. Tbxt is the founding member of the T-box family which in mammals currently consists of 18 T-box genes.

The crystal structure of the human brachyury protein was solved in 2017 by Opher Gileadi and colleagues at the Structural Genomics Consortium in Oxford.

Role in development 
The gene brachyury appears to have a conserved role in defining the midline of a bilaterian organism, and thus the establishment of the anterior-posterior axis; this function is apparent in chordates and molluscs.
Its ancestral role, or at least the role it plays in the Cnidaria, appears to be in defining the blastopore.  It also defines the mesoderm during gastrulation. Tissue-culture based techniques have demonstrated one of its roles may be in controlling the velocity of cells as they leave the primitive streak. It effects transcription of genes required for mesoderm formation and cellular differentiation.

Brachyury has also been shown to help establish the cervical vertebral blueprint during fetal development. The number of cervical vertebrae is highly conserved among all mammals; however a spontaneous vertebral and spinal dysplasia (VSD) mutation in this gene has been associated with the development of six or fewer cervical vertebrae instead of the usual seven.

Expression 
In mice T is expressed in the inner cell mass of the blastocyst stage embryo (but not in the majority of mouse embryonic stem cells) followed by the primitive streak (see image). In later development expression is localised to the node and notochord.

In Xenopus laevis Xbra (the Xenopus T homologue, also recently renamed t) is expressed in the mesodermal marginal zone of the pre-gastrula embryo followed by localisation to the blastopore and notochord at the mid-gastrula stage.

Orthologs 
The Danio rerio ortholog is known as ntl (no tail)

Role in disease

Cancer 
Brachyury is implicated in the initiation and/or progression of a number of tumor types including chordoma, germ cell tumors, hemangioblastoma, GIST, lung cancer, small cell carcinoma of the lung, breast cancer, colon cancer, hepatocellular carcinoma, prostate cancer, and oral squamous carcinoma.

In breast cancer brachyury expression is associated with recurrence, metastasis and reduced survival. It is also associated with resistance to tamoxifen and to cytotoxic chemotherapy.

In lung cancer brachyury expression is associated with recurrence and decreased survival. It is also associated with resistance to cytotoxic chemotherapy, radiation, and EGFR kinase inhibitors.

In prostate cancer brachyury expression is associated with Gleason score, perineural, invasion and capsular invasion.

In addition to its role in common cancers, brachyury has been identified as a definitive diagnostic marker, key driver and therapeutic target for chordoma, a rare malignant tumor that arises from remnant notochordal cells lodged in the vertebrae. The evidence regarding brachyury's role in chordoma includes:

 Brachyury is highly expressed in all chordomas except for the dedifferentiated subtype, which accounts for less than 5% of cases
 Germ line duplication of the brachyury gene is responsible for familial chordoma. 
 A germline SNP in brachyury is present in 97% of chordoma patients.
 Somatic amplifications of brachyury are seen in a subset of sporadic chordomas either by aneuploidy or focal duplication.
 Brachyury is the most selectively essential gene in chordoma relative to other cancer types.
 Brachyury is associated with a large superenhancer in chordoma tumors and cell lines, and is the most highly expressed superenhancer-associated transcription factor.

Brachyury is an important factor in promoting the epithelial–mesenchymal transition (EMT). Cells that over-express brachyury have down-regulated expression of the adhesion molecule E-cadherin, which allows them to undergo EMT. This process is at least partially mediated by the transcription factors AKT and Snail.

Overexpression of brachyury has been linked to hepatocellular carcinoma (HCC, also called malignant hepatoma), a common type of liver cancer. While brachyury is promoting EMT, it can also induce metastasis of HCC cells. Brachyury expression is a prognostic biomarker for HCC, and the gene may be a target for cancer treatments in the future.

Other diseases 
Overexpression of brachyury may play a part in EMT associated with benign disease such as renal fibrosis.

Role as a therapeutic target 
Because brachyury is expressed in tumors but not in normal adult tissues it has been proposed as a potential drug target with applicability across tumor types. In particular, brachyury-specific peptides are presented on HLA receptors of cells in which it is expressed, representing a tumor specific antigen. Various therapeutic vaccines have been developed which are intended to stimulate an immune response to brachyury expressing cells.

See also 

Homeobox protein NANOG
POU5F1
SOX2
MIXL1
GSC
Transcription factors
Gene regulatory network
Bioinformatics
Chordoma

References

Further reading

External links 
 Protein Atlas entry for Brachyury
 Mouse Genome Informatics entry for Brachyury
 European Bioinformatics Institute InterPro entry for Brachyury
 Information Hyperlinked Over Proteins entry for Brachyury
 Xenbase Gene entry for Brachyury
 

Transcription factors
Embryology